University Bank is a community bank headquartered in Ann Arbor, Michigan. It was founded in 1890 as The Newberry Bank, changed its name to The Newberry State Bank on May 3, 1908, adopting its current name, University Bank, in 1995. It has its headquarters in the Leander J. Hoover Mansion.

University Bancorp owns 100% of University Bank which, together with its Michigan-based subsidiaries, holds and manages a total of over $30.5 billion in financial assets for over 163,000 customers, and over 500 employees. University Bank is an FDIC-insured, locally owned and managed community bank.

History

University Bank is owned by University Bancorp and was initially founded in 1890 as the Newberry Bank. It received a bank charter in 1908 from the State of Michigan and changed its name to the Newberry State Bank.  It was originally the sole bank located in Newberry, Michigan in the Upper Peninsula. While the bank was founded in 1890, a bank holding company owned by Stephen Lange Ranzini and Joseph Ranzini acquired controlling interest in the bank in 1988. Under Ranzini's leadership as President and CEO of the Bancorp, the bank expanded into Sault Ste. Marie and doubled in size.

In 1994 Newberry State Bank sold its loans, deposits and branches to another bank in the Upper Peninsula. Retaining the bank charter, Ranzini changed the name of the charter to University Bank. He was interested in relocating the bank charter to Ann Arbor because there was only one other community bank based in Ann Arbor at the time, and this was a diverse, vibrant and growing community. A new management team was recruited and the bank opened in Ann Arbor in early 1996. After the initial management team was replaced, Ranzini took over the direct day-to-day management of the bank in late 1997.

In 2009, the FDIC and Michigan Office of Financial and Insurance Regulation sent a cease and desist order to University Bank mandating that they stop conducting business with SWIFT and requiring more liquidity. The order also noted that the bank lacked an effective system of controls to comply with the Bank Secrecy Act.

University Bank has grown rapidly and has been very profitable. Its annual revenue grew from $6.57 million in 2004 to over $140 million in 2020, an annually compounding internal rate of growth of 21.0%. Over those same 16 years, University Bank's return on shareholders equity has averaged 20.0%, and common shareholders' equity grew from $3.0 million in 2004 to over $50 million in 2020.

Subsidiaries

The members of University Bank's corporate family are:

 University Lending Group, a retail residential mortgage originator based in Clinton Township, MI
 Midwest Loan Services, a residential mortgage subservicer based in Hancock, MI
 UIF Corporation, a faith-based banking firm based in Southfield, MI
 Midwest Loan Solutions, a reverse residential mortgage lender and warehouse lender based in Southfield, MI
 University Bank, based in Ann Arbor, MI, which provides traditional community banking services in the Ann Arbor area
 Ann Arbor Insurance Centre, an independent insurance agency based in Ann Arbor

References

  Note: Citation of public domain material.

External links
University Bank official website

Banks based in Michigan
Banks established in 1890